The Grenada Trades Union Council (GTUC) is the national trade union center for Grenada. It was formed in 1955, and is affiliated with the International Trade Union Confederation.

References

See also

 Trade unions in Grenada
 List of federations of trade unions

Trade unions in Grenada
International Trade Union Confederation
Trade unions established in 1955
1955 establishments in the British Empire